Stefana is a given name. Notable people with the name include:

Stefana Miladinović, Serbian politician
Stefana Veljković, Serbian volleyball player

Serbian feminine given names